The 2010 United States Senate election in Idaho took place on November 2, 2010, alongside 33 other elections to the United States Senate in other states as well as elections to the United States House of Representatives and various state and local elections. Incumbent Republican U.S. Senator Mike Crapo won re-election to a third term.

Republican primary

Candidates 
 Mike Crapo, incumbent U.S. senator
 Skip Davis

Results

Democratic primary

Candidates 
 William Bryk
 Tom Sullivan,  merchant banker

Results

General election

Candidates 
 Randy Lynn Bergquist (Constitution) (PVS)
 Mike Crapo (R)
 Tom Sullivan (D) (campaign site, PVS, FEC, OTI)

Campaign 
Sullivan, a heavy underdog, criticized Crapo for being in Washington for too long, saying, "Senator Crapo has been in Congress for 18 years. The country is struggling, and I think it's time to make a change." Crapo emphasized his conservative record in Washington.

Debates 
 October 1 on Idaho Public Television
 October 20 on KTVB

Predictions

Polling

Fundraising

Results

See also 
 United States Senate elections, 2010

References

External links 
 Idaho Secretary of State - Elections, Campaign Disclosure and Lobbyists
 U.S. Congress candidates for Idaho at Project Vote Smart
 Idaho U.S. Senate from OurCampaigns.com
 Campaign contributions from Open Secrets
 Idaho Polls graph of multiple polls from Pollster.com
 Election 2010: Idaho Senate from Rasmussen Reports
 2010 Idaho Senate Race from Real Clear Politics
 2010 Idaho Senate Race from CQ Politics
 Race profile from The New York Times
Official candidate websites (Archived)
 Mike Crapo for U.S. Senate
 Claude Davis for U.S. Senate
 Tom Sullivan for U.S. Senate

2010 Idaho elections
Idaho
2010